Tissue alpha-L-fucosidase is an enzyme that in humans is encoded by the FUCA1 gene.

Alpha-Fucosidase is an enzyme that breaks down fucose.

Fucosidosis is an autosomal recessive lysosomal storage disease caused by defective alpha-L-fucosidase with accumulation of fucose in the tissues. Different phenotypes include clinical features such as neurologic deterioration, growth retardation, visceromegaly, and seizures in a severe early form; coarse facial features, angiokeratoma corporis diffusum, spasticity and delayed psychomotor development in a longer surviving form; and an unusual spondylometaphyseoepiphyseal dysplasia in yet another form.[supplied by OMIM]

See also
 Fucosidosis

References

Further reading

External links
 

Enzymes